Simon Robert Armitage  (born 26 May 1963) is an English poet, playwright, musician and novelist. He was appointed Poet Laureate on 10 May 2019. He is professor of poetry at the University of Leeds. 

He has published over 20 collections of poetry, starting with Zoom! in 1989. Many of his poems concern his home town in West Yorkshire; these are collected in Magnetic Field: The Marsden Poems. He has translated classic poems including the Odyssey, The Death of King Arthur, Pearl, and Sir Gawain and the Green Knight. He has written several travel books including Moon Country and Walking Home: Travels with a Troubadour on the Pennine Way. He has edited poetry anthologies including one on the work of Ted Hughes. He has participated in numerous television and radio documentaries, dramatisations, and travelogues.

Early life and education 

Armitage was born in Huddersfield, West Riding of Yorkshire, and grew up in the village of Marsden, where his family still live. He has an older sister, Hilary. His father Peter was a former electrician, probation officer and firefighter who was well known locally for writing plays and pantomimes for his all-male panto group, The Avalanche Dodgers.

He wrote his first poem aged 10 as a school assignment. Armitage first studied at Colne Valley High School, Linthwaite, and went on to study geography at Portsmouth Polytechnic. He was a postgraduate student at the University of Manchester, where his MA thesis concerned the effects of television violence on young offenders. Finding himself jobless after graduation, he decided to train as a probation officer, like his father before him. Around this time he began writing poetry more seriously, though he continued to work as a probation officer in Greater Manchester until 1994.

Career

He has lectured on creative writing at the University of Leeds and at the University of Iowa, and in 2008 was a senior lecturer at Manchester Metropolitan University. He has made literary, history and travel programmes for BBC Radio 3 and 4; and since 1992 he has written and presented a number of TV documentaries. From 2009 to 2012 he was Artist in Residence at London's South Bank, and in February 2011 he became Professor of Poetry at the University of Sheffield.  In October 2017 he was appointed as the first Professor of Poetry at the University of Leeds. In 2019 he was appointed Poet Laureate for ten years, following Carol Ann Duffy.

Writing 

Armitage's first book-length poetry collection Zoom! was published in 1989. As well as some new poems, it contained works published in three pamphlets in 1986 and 1987.
His poetry collections include Book of Matches (1993) and The Dead Sea Poems (1995). He has written two novels, Little Green Man (2001) and The White Stuff (2004), as well as All Points North (1998), a collection of essays on Northern England. He produced a dramatised version of Homer's Odyssey and a collection of poetry entitled Tyrannosaurus Rex Versus The Corduroy Kid (shortlisted for the T.S. Eliot Prize), both published in 2006. Armitage's poems feature in multiple British GCSE syllabuses for English Literature. He is characterised by a dry Yorkshire wit combined with "an accessible, realist style and critical seriousness." His translation of Sir Gawain and the Green Knight (2007) was adopted for the ninth edition of The Norton Anthology of English Literature, and he was the narrator of a 2010 BBC documentary about the poem and its use of landscape.

For the Stanza Stones Trail, which runs through  of the Pennine region, Armitage composed six new poems on his walks. With the help of local expert Tom Lonsdale and letter-carver Pip Hall, the poems were carved  into stones at secluded sites. A book, containing the poems and the accounts of Lonsdale and Hall, has been produced as a record of that journey and has been published by Enitharmon Press. The poems, complemented with commissioned wood engravings by Hilary Paynter, were also published in several limited editions under the title 'In Memory of Water' by Fine Press Poetry. For National Poetry Day in 2020, BT commissioned him to write "Something clicked", a reflection on lockdown during the COVID-19 pandemic.

Writing as Poet Laureate 

In 2019 Armitage's first poem as Poet Laureate, "Conquistadors", commemorating the 1969 moon landing, was published in The Guardian.
Armitage's second poem as Poet Laureate, "Finishing it", was commissioned in 2019 by the Institute of Cancer Research. Graham Short, a micro-engraver,  meticulously carved the entire 51-word poem clearly onto a facsimile of a cancer treatment tablet.
Armitage wrote "All Right" as part of Northern train operator's suicide prevention campaign for Mental Health Awareness Week. Their video has a sound track of the poem being read by Mark Addy, while the words also appear on screen.
On 21 September 2019 he read his poem "Fugitives", commissioned by the Association of Areas of Natural Beauty, on Arnside Knott, Cumbria, in celebration of the 70th anniversary of the National Parks and Access to the Countryside Act, during an event which included the formation of a heart outlined by people on the hillside.
Armitage wrote "Ark" for the naming ceremony of the British Antarctic Survey's new ship RRS Sir David Attenborough on 26 September 2019.
"the event horizon" was written in 2019 to commemorate the opening of The Oglesby Centre, an extension to Hallé St Peter's, the Halle orchestra's venue for rehearsals, recordings, education and small performances. The poem is incorporated into the building "in the form of a letter-cut steel plate situated in the entrance  to the auditorium, the 'event horizon'".
"Ode to a Clothes Peg" celebrates the bicentenary of John Keats' six 1819 odes of which Armitage says  "Among his greatest works, the poems are also some of the most famous in the English Language."

On 12 January 2020, Armitage gave the first reading of his poem "Astronomy for Beginners", written to celebrate the bicentenary of the Royal Astronomical Society, on BBC Radio 4's Broadcasting House. "Lockdown", first published in The Guardian on 21 March 2020, is a response to the coronavirus pandemic, referencing the Derbyshire "plague village" of Eyam, which self-isolated in 1665 to limit the spread of the Great Plague of London, and the Sanskrit poem "Meghadūta" by Kālidāsa, in which a cloud carries a message from an exile to his distant wife. Armitage read his "Still Life", another poem about the lockdown, on BBC Radio 4's Today programme on 20 April 2020.
An installation of his "The Omnipresent" was part of an outdoor exhibition Everyday Heroes at London's Southbank Centre in Autumn 2020.
Huddersfield Choral Society commissioned Armitage to provide lyrics for works by Cheryl Frances-Hoad and Daniel Kidane, resulting in "The Song Thrush and the Mountain Ash" and "We'll Sing", which were released on video in Autumn 2020. Armitage asked members of the choir to send him one word each to represent their experience of lockdown, and worked with these to produce the two lyrics. Armitage read "The Bed" in Westminster Abbey on 11 November 2020 at the commemoration of the 100th anniversary of the burial of The Unknown Warrior.

" 'I speak as someone ...' " was first published in The Times on 20 February 2021 and commemorates the 200th anniversary of the death of the poet John Keats, who died in Rome on 23 February 1821.
To mark a stage in the easing of lockdown, Armitage wrote Cocoon which he read on BBC Radio 4's Today on 29 March 2021.
"The Patriarchs – An Elegy" marks the death of Prince Philip and was released on the day of his funeral, 17 April 2021. It refers to the snow on the day of his death, and Armitage has said "I've written about a dozen laureate poems since I was appointed, but this is the first royal occasion and it feels like a big one". Armitage wrote "70 notices" in 2021 as a commission for the Off the Shelf Festival to celebrate the 70th anniversary of the creation of the Peak District National Park. "Futurama" was Armitage's response to the 2021 Cop26 conference held in Glasgow, and he said of it "I was trying to chart the peculiar dream-like state we seem to be in, where the rules and natural laws of the old world feel to be in flux". In November 2019 Armitage announced that he would donate his salary as poet laureate to create the Poetry School's Laurel Prize for a collection of poems "with nature and the environment at their heart". The prize is to be run by the Poetry School.

Armitage wrote "Resistance", about the 2022 Russian invasion of Ukraine, published in The Guardian on 12 March 2022. He described it as "a refracted version of what is coming at us in obscene images through the news". Armitage read his "Only Human" at York Minster on 23 March 2022 during a service on the second annual National Day of Reflection to remember lives lost during the COVID-19 pandemic; the poem will be inscribed in a garden of remembrance at the Minster. For the Platinum Jubilee of Elizabeth II in June 2022, Armitage wrote "Queenhood". It was published in The Times on 3 June and as a signed limited-edition pamphlet sold through commercial outlets, and on the royal.uk website. He published "Floral Tribute" on 13 September 2022, to commemorate the death of Elizabeth II; it takes the form of a double acrostic in which the initial letters of the lines of each of its two stanzas spell out "Elizabeth". Later that day he explained and read the poem on BBC News at Ten. To celebrate the centenary of the BBC, Armitage wrote "Transmission Report", which was broadcast on The One Show on 24 October 2022, read by a cast of BBC celebrities including Brian Cox, Michael Palin, Mary Berry and Chris Packham, accompanied by the BBC Concert Orchestra. Armitage wrote "The Making of the Flying Scotsman (a phantasmagoria)" to mark the centenary of the locomotive Flying Scotsman, which entered service on 24 February 1923.

The laureate's library tour 

In November 2019 Armitage announced that each spring for ten years he would spend a week touring five to seven libraries giving a one-hour poetry reading and perhaps introducing a guest poet. The libraries were to be selected in alphabetical order: in March 2020 he was to visit places or libraries with names starting with "A" or "B" (including the British Library), and so on until "W", "X", "Y" and "Z" in 2029. He comments: "The letter X will be interesting – does anywhere in the UK begin with X?  I also want to find a way of including alphabet letters from other languages spoken in these islands such as Welsh, Urdu or Chinese, and to involve communities where English might not be the first language."

After a delay caused by the COVID-19 pandemic, the first tour took place in 2021. Armitage read in various library buildings for a remote, online, live audience, beginning at Ashby-de-la-Zouch on 26 April and continuing to Belper with Helen Mort; Aberdeen with Mag Dixon; Bacup with Clare Shaw; Bootle with Amina Atiq and Eira Murphy; the British Library with Theresa Lola and Joelle Taylor; and Abington, where he officially opened the volunteer-run library on Saturday 1 May.

The 2022 tour visited libraries with initials C, D, and Welsh Ch and DD. Between 24 March and 1 April Armitage read at Chadderton with Keisha Thompson, Fateha Alam and Lawdy Karim; at Carmarthen with Ifor ap Glyn; at Clevedon with Phoebe Stuckes; at Colyton with  Elizabeth-Jane Burnett; at Chatham with  Patience Agbabi; at Cambridge University Library with Imtiaz Dharker; at Clydebank with Kathleen Jamie and Tawona Sitholé; and at Taigh Chearsabhagh on North Uist with  Kevin MacNeil.

The 2023 tour will visit libraries with initials E, F G and Welsh Ff and Ng.  the dates and venues were still to be confirmed.

Performing arts 

Armitage is the author of five stage plays, including Mister Heracles, a version of Euripides' The Madness of Heracles.  The Last Days of Troy premiered at Shakespeare's Globe in June 2014. He was commissioned in 1996 by the National Theatre in London to write Eclipse for the National Connections series, a play inspired by the real-life disappearance of Lindsay Rimer from Hebden Bridge in 1994, and set at the time of the 1999 solar eclipse in Cornwall.

Most recently Armitage wrote the libretto for an opera scored by Scottish composer Stuart MacRae, The Assassin Tree, based on a Greek myth recounted in The Golden Bough. The opera premiered at the 2006 Edinburgh International Festival, Scotland, before moving to the Royal Opera House, Covent Garden, London. Saturday Night (Century Films, BBC2, 1996) – wrote and narrated a fifty-minute poetic commentary to a documentary about night-life in Leeds, directed by Brian Hill. In 2010, Armitage walked the 264-mile Pennine Way, walking south from Scotland to Derbyshire. Along the route he stopped to give poetry readings, often in exchange for donations of money, food or accommodation, despite the rejection of the free life seen in his 1993 poem "Hitcher", and has written a book about his journey, called Walking Home.

In 2007 he released an album of songs co-written with the musician Craig Smith, under the band name The Scaremongers.

In 2016 the arts programme 14–18 NOW commissioned a series of poems by Simon Armitage as part of a five-year programme of new artwork created specifically to mark the centenary of the First World War. The poems are a response to six aerial or panoramic photographs of battlefields from the archive of the Imperial War Museum in London. The poetry collection Still premiered at the Norfolk & Norwich Festival and has been published in partnership with Enitharmon Press.

In 2019 he was commissioned by Sky Arts to create an epic poem and film The Brink as one of 50 projects in "Art 50" looking at British Identity in the light of Brexit. The Brink looked at the British relationship with Europe, as envisioned from the closest point of the mainland to the rest of the continent – Kent.

In 2020 and 2021 Armitage produced a podcast, The Poet Laureate Has Gone to His Shed, also broadcast on BBC Radio 4, in which, while working on the medieval poem The Owl and the Nightingale, he invited a series of 20 guests to come and talk to him in his garden writing-shed; a third series began in 2023.   Armitage worked with Brian Hill on Where Did The World Go?, a "pandemic poem" which "examines life and loss in lockdown and binds the whole narrative with a new, overarching poem from Armitage", and was shown on BBC Two in June 2021. In December 2020, he was featured walking from Ravenscar, along the old Cinder Track, a disused railway line, past Boggle Hole to Robin Hood's Bay, in the Winter Walks series on BBC Four. In August 2022 Armitage presented Larkin Revisited, a BBC Radio 4 series  commemorating  Philip Larkin's centenary, examining a single Larkin poem in  each of the ten episodes.

Personal life 

Armitage lives in the Holme Valley, West Yorkshire, close to his family home in Marsden. His first wife was Alison Tootell: they married in 1991. He then married radio producer Sue Roberts; they have a daughter, Emmeline, born in 2000. Emmeline won the 2017 SLAMbassadors national youth poetry slam for 13-18-year-olds. Continuing in both her father's and grandfather's tradition, she is a member of the National Youth Theatre and a singer.

He is a supporter of his local football team, Huddersfield Town, and refers to it many times in his book All Points North (1996). He is also a birdwatcher.

Music 

Armitage is the first poet laureate who is also a disc jockey. He is a music fan, especially of The Smiths. During what his wife Sue described as "a bit of a mid-life crisis", Armitage and his college friend Craig Smith founded the band The Scaremongers. Their only album, Born in a Barn, was released in 2010. Armitage is the lead singer of LYR, a band he is in alongside Richard Walters and Patrick J Pearson. The band is signed to Mercury KX, part of Decca Records. They released their debut album Call in the Crash Team in 2020 and a single called Winter Solstice in 2021 featuring Wendy Smith from Prefab Sprout.

In May 2020 Armitage was the guest on BBC Radio 4's Desert Island Discs. His choice of music included David Bowie's "Moonage Daydream"; his chosen book was the Oxford English Dictionary, and his luxury was a tennis ball.

Awards and distinctions

Awards 

 1988 Eric Gregory Award
 1989 Zoom! made a Poetry Book Society Choice
 1992 Forward Poetry Prize for Kid
 1993 Sunday Times Young Writer of the Year
 1994 Lannan Award
 1995 Forward Poetry Prize for The Dead Sea Poems
 1998 Yorkshire Post Book of the Year for All Points North
 2003 BAFTA winner
 2003 Ivor Novello Award for song-writing
 2004 Fellow of Royal Society for Literature
 2005 Spoken Word Award (Gold) for The Odyssey
 2006 Royal Television Society Documentary Award for Out of the Blue
 2008 The Not Dead (C4, Century Films) Mental Health in the Media Documentary Film Winner
 2010 Seeing Stars made a Poetry Book Society Choice
 2010 Keats-Shelley Prize for Poetry
 2010 Appointed a Commander of the Order of the British Empire (CBE) in the Queen's Birthday Honours List, for services to literature
 2012 The Death of King Arthur made Poetry Book Society Choice
 2012 Hay Festival Medal for Poetry
 2012 T S Eliot Prize, shortlist, The Death of King Arthur 
 2015 Oxford professor of poetry (4-year appointment)
 2017 PEN America Poetry in Translation Prize for Pearl: A New Verse Translation
 2018 Queen's Gold Medal for Poetry "for his body of work"
 2019 Poet Laureate of the United Kingdom, appointed for 10 years

Honorary degrees 

 1996 Doctor of Letters, University of Portsmouth
 1996 Honorary Doctorate, University of Huddersfield
 2009 Honorary Doctorate, Sheffield Hallam University
 2011 Doctor of the University, The Open University
 2015 Honorary Doctor of Letters, University of Leeds

Published works

Poetry collections 

Zoom! (Bloodaxe Books, 1989)
Kid (Faber and Faber, 1992)
Xanadu (Bloodaxe Books, 1992)
Book of Matches (Faber and Faber, 1993)
The Dead Sea Poems (Faber and Faber, 1995)
CloudCuckooLand (Faber and Faber, 1997)
Killing Time (Faber and Faber, 1999)
Selected Poems (Faber and Faber, 2001, contains poems from 6 earlier books)
The Universal Home Doctor (Faber and Faber, 2002)
Travelling Songs (Faber and Faber, 2002)
The Shout: Selected Poems (Harcourt, 2005)
Tyrannosaurus Rex Versus The Corduroy Kid (Faber and Faber, 2006)
The Not Dead (Pomona Books, 2008)
Out of the Blue (Enitharmon Press, 2008)
Seeing Stars (Faber and Faber, 2010)
Stanza Stones (Enitharmon Press, 2013)
Paper Aeroplane, Selected Poems 1989-2014 (Faber and Faber, 2014, contains poems from earlier collections)
Still – A Poetic Response to Photographs of the Somme Battlefield (Enitharmon Press, 2016)
The Unaccompanied (Faber and Faber, 2017)
Sandettie Light Vessel Automatic (Faber and Faber, 2019)
Magnetic Field: The Marsden Poems (Faber and Faber, 2020, contains poems from earlier collections)

Translation 

Homer's Odyssey (2006)

The Death of King Arthur (2012)
Pearl (2017)
Sir Gawain and The Green Knight (2018) [2007], new revised translation, illustrated by Clive Hicks-Jenkins

Pamphlets and limited editions 

Human Geography (Smith/Doorstop Books, 1986)
Distance Between Stars (Wide Skirt, 1987)
The Walking Horses (Slow Dancer, 1988)
Around Robinson (Slow Dancer, 1991)
The Anaesthetist (Clarion, Illustrated by Velerii Mishin, 1994)
Five Eleven Ninety Nine (Clarion, Illustrated by Toni Goffe, 1995)
Machinery of Grace: A Tribute to Michael Donaghy (Poetry Society, 2005), Contributor
The North Star (University of Aberdeen, 2006), Contributor
The Motorway Service Station as a Destination in its Own Right (Smith/Doorstop Books, 2010)
In Memory of Water – The Stanza Stones poems. (Wood engravings by Hilary Paynter. Fine Press Poetry, 2013)
Considering the Poppy – (Wood engravings by Chris Daunt. Fine Press Poetry, 2014)
Waymarkings – (Wood engravings by Hilary Paynter. Fine Press Poetry, 2016)
 New Cemetery (Published by propolis, 2017)
 Exit the Known World – (Wood engravings by Hilary Paynter. Fine Press Poetry, 2018)
 Flit – (Poetry and photographs by Simon Armitage. Yorkshire Sculpture Park, 2018, 40th anniversary edition)
 Hansel and Gretel – (A new narrative poem by Simon Armitage, illustrated by Clive Hicks-Jenkins. Design for Today, 2019)
 Gymnasium – (Drawings by Antony Gormley. Fine Press Poetry, 2019)
 Tract – (Paintings by Hughie O'Donoghue. Fine Press Poetry, 2021)
 The Bed – (Painting by Alison Watt. Fine Press Poetry, 2021)
 70 Notices – (A celebration to mark 70 years of The Peak District as a National Park. Frontispiece by David Robertson. Fine Press Poetry, 2021)

Books

As editor 

 Penguin Modern Poets: Book 5 (with Sean O'Brien and Tony Harrison, 1995)
 The Penguin Book of Poetry from Britain and Ireland since 1945 (with Robert Crawford, 1998)
 Short and Sweet: 101 Very Short Poems (1999)
 Ted Hughes Poems: Selected by Simon Armitage (2000)
 The Poetry of Birds (with Tim Dee, 2009)

As author

 Moon Country (with Glyn Maxwell, 1996)
 Eclipse (1997)
 All Points North (1998)
 Mister Heracles After Euripides (2000)
 Little Green Man (2001)
 The White Stuff (2004)
 King Arthur in the East Riding (Pocket Penguins, 2005)
 Jerusalem (2005)
 The Twilight Readings (2008)
 Gig: The Life and Times of a Rock-star Fantasist (2008)
 Walking Home: Travels with a Troubadour on the Pennine Way (2012)
 Walking Away : Further Travels with a Troubadour on the South West Coast Path (2015)
 Mansions in the Sky (2017)

Selected television and radio works
Second Draft from Saga Land – six programmes for BBC Radio 3 on W. H. Auden and Louis MacNeice.
Eyes of a Demigod – on Victor Grayson commissioned by BBC Radio 3.
The Amherst Myth –  on Emily Dickinson, for BBC Radio 4.
Points of Reference – on the history of navigation and orientation, for BBC Radio 4.
From Salford to Jericho – A verse drama for BBC Radio 4.
To Bahia and Beyond – Five travelogue features in verse with Glyn Maxwell from Brazil and the Amazon for BBC Radio 3.
The Bayeux Tapestry – A six-part dramatisation, with Geoff Young, for BBC Radio 3.
Saturday Night (1996) – Century Films/BBC TV
A Tree Full of Monkeys (2002) – commissioned by BBC Radio 3, with Zoviet France.
The Odyssey (2004) – A three-part dramatisation for BBC Radio 4.
Writing the City (2005) – commissioned by BBC Radio 3.
Sir Gawain and the Green Knight (2010) – BBC documentary
Gods and Monsters — Homer's Odyssey (2010) – BBC documentary
The Making of King Arthur (2010) – BBC documentary
The Pendle Witch Child (2011) – BBC documentary, examining the role of Jennet Device in the Pendle Witch Trials
Black Roses: The Killing of Sophie Lancaster (2011), consisting of poems telling the story of Sophie Lancaster's life, together with the personal recollections of her mother.
The Last Days of Troy (2015) – A two-part dramatisation for BBC Radio 4.
The Brink (2018) – a meditation on the British relationship with Europe in the light of Brexit. For Sky Arts. The Poet Laureate Has Gone to His Shed (2020 and 2021) - BBC Radio 4 series and podcast, two series of 12 and 9 episodes

 See also 
 AQA Anthology

 References 

 Further reading 

 Ian Gregson, Simon Armitage, Salt Modern Poets Series: Salt, Cambridge, 2011.
 Jeremy Noel-Tod, "Profile: Simon Armitage". Areté'' 4, Winter 2000, pp. 31–49.

External links 

 
 
 
 Simon Armitage at the British Film Institute
 Poetry Archive Biography, interviews, poems and audio files.
 Guardian interview (07/2001)  
 Independent Interview Sunday, 21 September 1997 
 BBC Interview  (03/2004)   
 Griffin Poetry Prize 2006 keynote speech, including audio clip 
 Sonnets.org interview (01/2002)

1963 births
Living people
20th-century British poets
20th-century English poets
21st-century English male writers
21st-century English novelists
21st-century English poets
Academics of the University of Leeds
Academics of the University of Oxford
Academics of the University of Sheffield
Alumni of the University of Portsmouth
Alumni of the Victoria University of Manchester
Birdwatchers
British male dramatists and playwrights
British male poets
British Poets Laureate
Commanders of the Order of the British Empire
English dramatists and playwrights
English male novelists
Fellows of the Royal Society of Literature
Iowa Writers' Workshop faculty
Ivor Novello Award winners
New Statesman people
The New Yorker people
Oxford Professors of Poetry
People from Marsden, West Yorkshire
Probation and parole officers
Writers from Yorkshire